The Peru national rugby sevens team, is the representative national team in the sport of rugby sevens for the nation of Peru. The national team usually competes in the CONSUR Sevens (the regional tournament of South America).

Tournament history

References

S
National rugby sevens teams